The First Presbyterian Church is a historic church building in Columbia, South Carolina.  Constructed in 1854, it was added to the National Register of Historic Places on January 25, 1971.

History
Although the first meetings of what would become the First Presbyterian Church were held in 1795, the congregation did not have a building of its own until 1813, having met in the South Carolina State House and on the campus of the South Carolina College until then. In 1813, the South Carolina Legislature incorporated the church as the "First Presbyterian Church of the Town of Columbia"

The current site of the church was a shared cemetery with the local Episcopal congregation from 1794 to 1813.  The legislature gave the cemetery and other lands to be shared between the Episcopalians and the Presbyterians.  A local legend says that First Presbyterian and the now-nearby Trinity Episcopal Cathedral drew lots to determine which congregation would get what lot, with First Presbyterian receiving the cemetery, located at the corner of Lady and Marion Streets.

The 1813 building still exists, and is now known as Jackson Hall.  A new, larger English Gothic structure was built in 1853.  Though spared the torch during Sherman's march to the sea, the building's original 180-foot spire was destroyed in an 1875 hurricane, and rebuilt in 1888.  The spire was again damaged in a 1910 fire, and rebuilt to be eight feet taller.  A remodelling in 1925 increased the capacity of the building to 1,250 from 800, increasing the length of the building by 40 feet. At the same time, classrooms were built at the sides, a choir loft added in the rear, and the organ loft rebuilt.

Formerly a member of the Presbyterian Church in the United States, it seceded in 1983 and joined the Associate Reformed Presbyterian Church. The current pastor is Derek Thomas.  Among the notable people buried in the church's cemetery are the parents of Woodrow Wilson; Henry William de Saussure, second director of the United States Mint; Jonathan Maxcy, the first president of South Carolina College; and Martha Thomas Fitzgerald, first woman elected in a general election to the South Carolina House of Representatives.

References

External links
Church website

Historic American Buildings Survey in South Carolina
Churches completed in 1854
19th-century Presbyterian church buildings in the United States
Presbyterian churches in South Carolina
Protestant Reformed cemeteries
Churches on the National Register of Historic Places in South Carolina
National Register of Historic Places in Columbia, South Carolina
1813 establishments in the United States
Churches in Columbia, South Carolina
Associate Reformed Presbyterian Church